Mark Brown (born 9 February 1975) is a New Zealand professional golfer. He was particularly successful in 2007 and 2008. In early 2008 he won the SAIL Open Golf Championship and the  Johnnie Walker Classic in successive weeks and was in the world top 100 for much of 2008. He played on the European Tour from 2008 to 2011.

Early life and professional career
Brown was born in Lower Hutt. He had played golf on the PGA Tour of Australasia, the Canadian Tour and the Asian Tour without much success until 2007 when he had four top-ten finishes on the Asian Tour and finished 15th on the Order of Merit.

In 2008, he won his first Asian Tour event at the SAIL Open Golf Championship at Jaypee Greens in India. The following week he won the Johnnie Walker Classic, which was also held in India and was co-sanctioned by the European Tour and the PGA Tour of Australasia. This victory propelled Brown to 64th in the Official World Golf Ranking and he became the highest ranked golfer from New Zealand. He finished 2008 by winning the PGA Tour of Australasia's Order of Merit.

Brown played on the European Tour from 2008 to 2011 but lost his place on the tour after 2011. Apart from his win in 2008, his best finish was to be tied for 3rd place in the 2009 Volvo China Open. From 2012 he played mostly on the PGA Tour of Australasia and the OneAsia tour. He was runner-up in the 2012 New Zealand PGA Championship and the 2014 New Zealand Open. He has won four times on the Charles Tour, all his wins coming in the Carrus Open at the Tauranga Golf Club in Tauranga. He twice scored 59 in the Carrus Open, both in the second round. He first achieved it in 2014, when he won the event, and repeated the feat in 2018, when he eventually finished as a runner-up.

Professional wins (7)

European Tour wins (1)

1Co-sanctioned by the Asian Tour and the PGA Tour of Australasia

Asian Tour wins (2)

1Co-sanctioned by the European Tour and the PGA Tour of Australasia

PGA Tour of Australasia wins (1)

1Co-sanctioned by the European Tour and the Asian Tour

Charles Tour wins (4)

Golf Tour of New Zealand wins (1)
2006 Olex Taranaki Open

Results in major championships

CUT = missed the half-way cut
"T" = tied

Results in World Golf Championships

"T" = Tied
Note that the HSBC Champions did not become a WGC event until 2009.

Team appearances
Amateur
Eisenhower Trophy (representing New Zealand): 1994

Professional
World Cup (representing New Zealand): 2008, 2018

References

External links

New Zealand male golfers
European Tour golfers
Asian Tour golfers
PGA Tour of Australasia golfers
Sportspeople from Lower Hutt
1975 births
Living people